The Siloam Springs Downtown Historic District encompasses the historic downtown area of Siloam Springs, Arkansas. The district is roughly bounded by University Street, Broadway, and Sager Creek, with a few buildings on adjacent streets outside this triangular area.  This business district was developed mainly between about 1896, when the railroad arrived, and 1940, and contains a significant number of buildings dating to that period.  It also includes Siloam Springs City Park, the location of the springs that gave the city its name.  Notable buildings include the First National Bank building, a c. 1890 Romanesque Revival building, and the c. 1881 Lakeside Hotel, which is one of the city's oldest commercial buildings.

The district was listed on the National Register of Historic Places in 1995.

See also
National Register of Historic Places listings in Benton County, Arkansas

References

Historic districts on the National Register of Historic Places in Arkansas
Neoclassical architecture in Arkansas
Beaux-Arts architecture in Arkansas
Art Deco architecture in Arkansas
Historic districts in Benton County, Arkansas
Buildings and structures in Siloam Springs, Arkansas
National Register of Historic Places in Benton County, Arkansas